Colonel general is a three- or four-star military rank used in some armies. The rank of colonel general also exists in the armed forces organized along the lines of the Soviet model, where it is comparable to that of a lieutenant general in many NATO armed forces (rank code OF-8). The rank of colonel general that exists within the Arab model corresponds to a full general (NATO rank code OF-9).

Austria

Colonel general
() was the second-highest rank in the Austro-Hungarian Army, introduced following the German model in 1915. The rank was not used after World War I in the Austrian Army of the Republic.

Czechoslovakia 
The rank of colonel general was created in the Czechoslovak army in 1950; it was dropped after the 1993 dissolution of the state.

Egypt
The Egyptian Army uses a rank that translates as "colonel general". It is equal to the rank of 4-star or "full" general. Colonel general is, however, junior to the rank of field marshal and is an honorary distinction usually held only by defense ministers.

France

In the French Army, under the Ancien régime, the officer in nominal command of all the regiments of a particular branch of service (i. e. infantry, cavalry, dragoons, Swiss troops, etc.) was known as the colonel general. This was not a rank, but an office of the Crown.

Georgia
The Republic of Georgia adopted Soviet designations after its independence in 1991 so that the rank of colonel-general exists, yet it is only used as highest possible rank in the Patrol Police and Border Police of the Ministry of Internal Affairs. In the Defence Forces it is the highest possible rank for all general officers and the Chief of Defence Forces (who currently holds minimum rank of major general).

Germany

It later was split into said two ranks and eventually was adopted by the other state forces of the German Empire.

It was also used in the Reichswehr of the Weimar Republic, and more prominently within the Wehrmacht. The rank continued in the National People's Army of East Germany until German reunification in 1990. The Bundeswehr, first in West Germany and since 1990 in unified Germany, does not use it and has General as highest rank.

Hungary
In Hungary, the rank of colonel general (vezérezredes) was introduced to the Imperial and Royal Army (the common ground force of the Dual Monarchy) in 1915. The rank replaced the ranks of gyalogsági tábornok (general of infantry), lovassági tábornok (general of cavalry), and táborszernagy (general of artillery) in the early 1940s.

The rank title vezérezredes is still in use for the highest ranking (four-star) general officers of the Hungarian Defence Forces and foreign four-star general officers' rank titles are usually translated as vezérezredes in Hungarian, including Commonwealth air forces' Air Chief Marshals.

Iraq
The equivalent rank for Colonel general in Iraq is called , which is now considered the highest rank in the Iraqi Army.

Mongolia 
In 1961, J.Lkhagvasuren was awarded the title of Colonel General of the People's Republic of Mongolia. There are 9 people in Mongolia who have been promoted to colonel general. Currently, one person is currently living. He is Sonomyn Luvsangombo.  Since 2006, this rank has been removed from the ranks of the Mongolian Armed Forces.

North Korea

The North Korean rank of sangjang translates as "colonel general". Sangjang is senior to that of jungjang (usually translated as "lieutenant general") and junior to that of daejang (usually translated as "general").

This rank is typically held by the commanding officer of units along the Korean DMZ and the North Korean security zone at Panmunjom. It is also the rank held by the KPA Pyongyang Defense Command's commanding general.

Russia

The rank of colonel general ( was first established in the Red Army on 7 May 1940, as a replacement for the previously existing  ("army commander of the second rank"). During World War II, about 199 officers were promoted to colonel general. Before 1943, Soviet colonel generals wore four stars on their collar patches. Since 1943, they have worn three stars on their shoulder straps, so Charles Pettibone compares the rank to the US lieutenant general.

Unlike the German  (which it most probably calqued), the Soviet and Russian colonel general rank is neither an exceptional nor a rare one, as it is a normal step in the "ladder" between a two-star lieutenant general and a four-star army general.

Other than that, the Soviet and Russian rank systems sometimes cause confusion in regard to equivalence of ranks, because the normal Western title for brigadier or brigadier general ceased to exist for the Russian Army in 1798. The Kombrig rank that corresponded to one-star general only existed in the Soviet Union during 1935–1940. Positions typically reserved for these ranks, such as brigade commanders, have always been occupied by colonels or, very rarely, major generals (see History of Russian military ranks).

The rank has usually been given to district, front and army commanders, and also to deputy ministers of defense, deputy heads of the general staff and so on.

In some post-Soviet Commonwealth of Independent States armies (for example in Belarus), there are no generals of the army or marshals, and so colonel general is the highest rank, usually held by the minister of defense.

The corresponding naval rank is admiral, which is also denoted by three stars.

Sweden
Colonel general (generalöverste) has also been a senior military rank in Sweden, used principally before the 19th century.

Syria
The Syrian Arab Army uses the rank of colonel general ( "Imad-awwalعماد أول) only for the senior-most rank of the army beneath that of field marshal. Usually, only defence ministers have held this rank – only six officers have held this rank till now – Hafez al-Assad, Mustafa Tlass, Hikmat al-Shihabi, Ali Habib Mahmud, Dawoud Rajiha and Fahd Jassem al-Freij.

Ukraine
Colonel general – obsolete military rank of general officers of the Ground Forces, Air Force, Navy (only Marine Corps, Naval Aviation and Shore Establishment). It was first introduced in 1920 as part of a rank system in Ukrainian People's Army replacing such terms as Sotnyk general and Bunchuk general.

From October 1, 2020, the rank of "Colonel General" in Ukraine was no longer assigned and the highest rank of "General" was introduced. Until 2020, it was a higher rank than a lieutenant general, but a lower rank than General of the Army of Ukraine.

Although the rank of colonel-general has not been awarded since 2020, it remains with its current bearers until they receive the military rank of general. Despite the fact that the military rank of colonel-general was withdrawn from circulation, after the next version of the order, the insignia of this rank were indicated. The colonel-general has shoulder straps with four four-rayed stars above the maces. To distinguish the holders of the rank of Colonel General from the holders of the newly introduced rank of General (have the same number of stars on the shoulder straps), it was decided to apply different schemes of star placement. The stars on the shoulder straps of the generals are located along the axis of the shoulder strap, and the stars of the colonel generals are arranged in a diamond.

Equivalent to the ranks of colonel-general and general in the navy is the rank of admiral. Until 2020, the ranks of Colonel General and Admiral were denoted by three stars. Since 2020, the ranks of General, Colonel General and Admiral have become four-star ranks (with existing Colonel Generals slotted below Generals of the Armed Forces).

Insignia of the rank of Colonel-General, Ukraine:

United Kingdom
The title of colonel general was used before and during the English Civil War in both Royalist and Parliamentarian armies. In these cases, it often appears to have meant a senior colonel as opposed to a senior general.

Vietnam
In Vietnam, the rank of colonel general is known as Thượng Tướng (literally "upper general"). It is a three-star rank (OF-9a) in the Ground Force and Air Force. Thượng Tướng is senior to Trung Tướng (usually translated as "lieutenant general") and junior to Đại Tướng (usually translated as "general"). It is used in the army and the air force. It is the equivalent to Đô Đốc (admiral) in the Navy.

Colonel generals' insignia

See also
 Lieutenant colonel general
List of Colonel Generals

References

External links
Biographies of German army generalobersten
Biographies of Luftwaffe generalobersten
Biographies of Austro-Hungarian generalobersten of WWI 

Colonel generals
Military ranks